The 2013 Copa EuroAmericana was the first edition of the Copa EuroAmericana, an exhibition men's football friendly tournament created by DirecTV. This edition took place in various locations across South America from 20 July to 4 August 2013. Eleven teams from both CONMEBOL and UEFA participated in the tournament. Europe, represented by Atlético Madrid, Porto and Sevilla, won the cup by a 6–2 score, beating South America, represented by Atlético Nacional, Barcelona, Deportivo Anzoátegui, Estudiantes, Millonarios, Nacional, Sporting Cristal and Universidad Católica.

Format
Each match was played for 90 minutes. In the case of a draw after regulation, the winners were determined via a penalty shoot-out. The confederation of the winning team of each match was awarded with a point, and the confederation with the most points at the end of the tournament was crowned champions.

Participating teams

Venues

Standings

Matches

Top goalscorers

References

External links 
2013 Copa EuroAmericana: Official site
Footballzz.co.uk: Copa EuroAmericana 2013

2013 in South American football
Copa EuroAmericana
Colombian football friendly trophies
Peruvian football friendly trophies
Argentine football friendly trophies
Ecuadorian football friendly trophies
Chilean football friendly trophies
Venezuelan football friendly trophies
Uruguayan football friendly trophies